Tula's International School, is a private co-educational residential school from grade IV to grade XII in Dehradun, Uttarakhand, India affiliated to CBSE. It was established in 2013 by the non-profit Rishabh Educational Trust which was founded by Sunil Kumar Jain in the year 2004.

References

External links 
 

 BSI Website

International schools in India
High schools and secondary schools in Uttarakhand
Boarding schools in Uttarakhand
Schools in Dehradun
Educational institutions established in 2013
2014 establishments in Uttarakhand